The 2004 Pan American Cycling Championships took place at the El Baquiano Velodrome, Cojedes, Venezuela from 20 to 27 June 2004.

Medal summary

Road

Men

Women

Under 23 Men

Track

Men

Women

References

Americas
Americas
Cycling
Pan American Road and Track Championships
International cycle races hosted by Venezuela